"Andrew Lammie" is Child ballad 233 (Roud 98).  It is said to record a historical event, with the grave of the heroine in the churchyard at Fyvie.

Synopsis

Tifty’s Annie falls in love with Andrew Lammie, a lord's trumpeter.  Her parents refuse permission because he is poor.  He has to leave, and although he has promised fidelity and to return, she sickens.  Her family, set against the match, try beatings to make her give him up, but it is unavailing.  They may send to the lord accusing Andrew Lammie of bewitching her, but the lord believes his claim that it was only love. 

She dies, either of a broken heart or her back broken by her brother.  Her father may repent of his insistence.  Usually, Andrew Lammie dies soon after.

Recordings

This ballad also forms the unifying device of a ballad opera, Mill O' Tifty's Annie, by the Scottish composer Eric James Reid (1935–1970). There were several performances in the 1960s. Subsequently, a concert suite devised by Geoffrey Atkinson from the opera was made available.

External links
Andrew Lammie
Andrew Lammie (Mill o' Tifty's Annie)
Mill o' Tifty's Annie - found in Fyvie

Child Ballads